Independence College or variation may refer to:

 Independence Junior College, Independence Village, Stann Creek District, Belize; a tertiary school
 Independence Community College, formerly Independence Community Junior College, in Independence, Kansas, USA
 Independence University, formerly California College for Health Sciences, Salt Lake City, Utah, USA; an online university

See also
 Independence (disambiguation)